K-Warren (born Kevin Warren Williams in 1974) is a UK garage producer. He is a former member of the group Architechs, known for their UK garage remix of Brandy and Monica's "The Boy Is Mine" (1998). K-Warren's best-known releases are "Coming Home", Richie Dan's "Call It Fate" (as producer) and his mix of Ed Case's "Something in Your Eyes". All three songs were top 40 hits on the UK Singles Chart, peaking at numbers 32, 34 and 38 respectively, with "Coming Home" also reaching number one on the UK Dance Singles Chart.

References

External links

UK garage musicians
Musicians from London
English record producers
Remixers
Black British musicians
Living people
1974 births
Go! Beat artists
Date of birth missing (living people)